Madampi (equivalent to Lord in English) is an aristocratic title given to the uppermost subdivisions of Nairs in Kerala, by the Maharajahs of Travancore and Cochin. Usually, it was given in addition to the Pillai title. Madampis served as Jenmis or landlords during the pre-independence era. Their power was severely reduced after the Communist government passed the Land Reforms Ordinance. The title Madampi was also used in Cochin, to denote the 71 Nayar chiefs who ruled under the Maharajah of Cochin. A few Nambuthiri landlord families, most notable of whom being those in Vanjipuzha and Makilanjeri, were also given the Madampi title. In Cochin, the Madampis had their own armies, but seldom numbered more than 100. Their power was only a little bit higher than that of the Desavazhis. Madampis supplied chieftains along with soldiers in times
of war to the King.

This title is equivalent to others such as Eshmanan, Eman and Mannadiyar which were used in Cochin and Malabar areas. Other titles used by the Nairs include Kurup, Pillai, Panikker, Valiathan, Menon, Kaimal, Thampi, Chempakaraman, Nambiar, Nayanar, Kartha and Unnithan.

See also
 Eshmanan
Pillai
 Travancore
 Mannadiyar
Nayanar
 Thakur

References

Nair
 Mad